The united front is a political strategy of the Chinese Communist Party (CCP) involving networks of groups and key individuals that are influenced or controlled by the CCP and used to advance its interests. It has historically been a popular front that has included eight legally-permitted political parties and people's organizations which have nominal representation in the National People's Congress and the Chinese People's Political Consultative Conference (CPPCC). Under CCP general secretary Xi Jinping, the united front and its targets of influence have expanded in size and scope.

United front organizations are managed primarily by the United Front Work Department (UFWD), but the united front strategy is not limited solely to the UFWD. CPPCC is considered to be the highest-ranking united front organization, being central to the system. Outside of China, the strategy involves numerous front organizations, which tend to obfuscate or downplay any association with the CCP.

History

The CCP organized the "National Revolution United Front" with the Kuomintang during the Northern Expedition of 1926–1928 and then the "Workers' and Peasants' Democratic United Front" in the Chinese Soviet Republic era of 1931–1937. Mao Zedong originally promoted the "Anti-Japanese National United Front".

The united front "assumed its current form" in 1946, three years before the CCP defeated the authoritarian governing party Kuomintang's Nationalist government of Chiang Kai-shek. Mao credited the united front as one of his "Three Magic Weapons" against the Kuomintang—alongside the Leninist Chinese Communist Party and the Red Army—and credited the Front with playing a part in the Chinese Communist Revolution.

Organs 
The two organs historically affiliated with united Front are the United Front Work Department and the Chinese People's Political Consultative Conference (CPPCC). According to Yi-Zheng Lian, the organs "are often poorly understood outside China because there are no equivalents for them in the West". Inside China, leaders of formal united front organizations are selected by the CCP, or are themselves CCP members. In practice, united front member parties and allied people's organizations are subservient to the CCP, and must accept the CCP's "leading role" as a condition of their continued existence.

United Front Work Department

The United Front Work Department is headed by the chief of the secretariat of the CCP's Central Committee. It oversees front organizations and their affiliates in multiple countries such as the Chinese Students and Scholars Association, which helps Chinese students and academics studying or residing in the West, enjoining them to conduct "people-to-people diplomacy" on behalf of the People's Republic of China.

Activities 

The united front is a political strategy that the CCP has used to influence beyond its immediate circles while downplaying direct associations with the CCP. In theory, the united front existed to give front organizations and non-Communist forces a platform in society. Historically, the CCP co-opted and re-purposed non-Communist organizations to become part of the united front through tactics of entryism. However, scholars describe the contemporary united front as a complex network of organizations that engage in various types of surveillance and political warfare for the CCP. Scholar Jichang Lulu noted that united front organizations abroad "re-purpose democratic governance structures to serve as tools of extraterritorial influence." Additionally, many non-governmental organizations in China or connected to China have been described as government-organized non-governmental organization (GONGOs) that are organized under the CCP's united front system.

According to a 2018 report by the United States-China Economic and Security Review Commission, "United Front work serves to promote Beijing’s preferred global narrative, pressure individuals living in free and open societies to self-censor and avoid discussing issues unfavorable to the CCP, and harass or undermine groups critical of Beijing’s policies." According to Financial Times, nearly all Chinese embassies include staff that are formally tasked with united front work.

Scholar Jeffrey Stoff also argues that the CPP's "influence apparatus intersects with or directly supports its global technology transfer apparatus." In 2019, the united front's aggregate budget across multiple institutions was estimated at over $2.6 billion which was larger than the Chinese Foreign Ministry's budget.

According to the Taiwanese Mainland Affairs Council, the united front uses internet celebrities to carry out infiltration campaigns on social media.

Starting in January 2020, united front-linked organizations in Canada and other countries were activated to purchase, stockpile, and export personal protective equipment in response to the COVID-19 pandemic in mainland China. In September 2020, the CCP announced that it would strengthen united front work in the private sector by establishing more party committees in regional federations of industry and commerce (FIC), and by arranging a special liaison between FICs and the CCP.

Relationship with intelligence agencies 

In 1939, Zhou Enlai espoused "nestling intelligence within the united front" while also "using the united front to push forth intelligence." According to Australian analyst Alex Joske, "the united front system provides networks, cover and institutions that intelligence agencies use for their own purposes." Joske added that "united front networks are a golden opportunity for Party's spies because they represent groups of Party-aligned individuals who are relatively receptive to clandestine recruitment."

Organizations affiliated with the united front

Organizations managed by or affiliated with the United Front Work Department 

 All-China Federation of Industry and Commerce
 Center for China and Globalization
 China Council for the Promotion of Peaceful National Reunification
 China News Service
 Chinese People's Association for Friendship with Foreign Countries
 Chinese Students and Scholars Association
Religious organizations formerly managed by the State Administration for Religious Affairs:
 Buddhist Association of China
 Chinese Taoist Association
 Islamic Association of China
 Three-Self Patriotic Movement
 Catholic Patriotic Association
National Ethnic Affairs Commission

Other united front organizations 

 China Council for the Promotion of International Trade (Ministry of Commerce)
 China International Culture Exchange Center (Ministry of State Security)

See also 

 Political warfare

Notes

References 

Organization of the Chinese Communist Party
China
Technology transfer
Chinese information operations and information warfare
 
Espionage in China